Jody Tini (born 10 February 1976 in Whangarei, New Zealand) is a basketball player for New Zealand. At the 2006 Commonwealth Games she won a silver medal as part of the Tall Ferns New Zealand women's basketball team.

She comes from a basketball family as she is the sister of Tall Black captain Pero Cameron, and the daughter of Mata Cameron, a national age group coach.

References

1976 births
Living people
New Zealand women's basketball players
Basketball players at the 2006 Commonwealth Games
Commonwealth Games silver medallists for New Zealand
Basketball players at the 2004 Summer Olympics
Sportspeople from Whangārei
Olympic basketball players of New Zealand
Commonwealth Games medallists in basketball
Medallists at the 2006 Commonwealth Games